David Higgins (born 14 November 1972 on the Isle of Man) is a Manx rally driver. He is an 8-time Rally America champion and a 2-time ARA Champion with Subaru Motorsports USA.

Early and personal life
Born on the Isle of Man but living in Trefeglwys near Llanidloes, Powys, Wales his brother Mark is also a rally and stunt driver. Higgins started motorcycle trials aged 8, and aged 10 he moved into the UK national kart racing circuit, winning seven titles against drivers including later Formula 1 driver David Coulthard.

Higgins stills lives in Trefeglwys, with his wife and two children, Alicia and Matthew, both of whom are karting drivers.

Career
In 1993 he won his first rally car title, the Peugeot Challenge. Higgins won the 1997, 1999 and 2002 British Rally Championships in the Group N category. He then won the SCCA ProRally Championship in the United States in 2002 and 2003. Grassroots Motorsports presented David Higgins with the Editors' Choice Award in 2003. In 2004 he returned to the British championship for what was supposed to be a one-off entry at the season opener in a Hyundai Accent WRC. After winning the opening round he went on to complete the full season, winning the title.
From 2004, Higgins spent his time rallying in China. He began in 2004, competing in three events and winning two of them to help Ralliart Hong Kong to win the teams' title. He returned in 2006, beginning a long relationship with the Wanyu rally team. In 2007 he won every round in the championship and helped the team to win the title in both 2007 and 2009.

In 2011 Higgins joined Subaru Rally Team USA in the Rally America series as a replacement for Travis Pastrana. He won the title at the first attempt with three wins from six events. That same year he also set the new record up Mount Washington in a Subaru Impreza, faster than Pastrana's run up the mountain. Later, in 2014, he would beat his own record again with Co-Driver Craig Drew. He won the Rally America championship 8 times in 2002, 2003, 2011, 2012, 2013, 2014, 2015, and 2016. He also won the American Rally Association National Championship in 2018 and 2019.  Of those 10 championships, Higgins achieved 8 with Subaru Rally Team USA.

Racing record

Complete WRC results

Complete Global RallyCross Championship results

AWD

Supercar

Race cancelled.

References

External links

Living people
1972 births
People from Montgomeryshire
Sportspeople from Powys
British rally drivers
Manx racing drivers
World Rally Championship drivers
Intercontinental Rally Challenge drivers
Global RallyCross Championship drivers